Justin J. J. Humphrey (born August 17, 1966) is an American politician from the state of Oklahoma. A Republican, he is a member of the Oklahoma House of Representatives, representing state House District 19. He lives in Lane, Oklahoma, in the southeastern part of the state.

Early life and career before politics
Justin Humphrey is the son of Jack Humphrey, a retired superintendent of Lane Public Schools, and Linda Humphrey, a librarian. He was born on August 17, 1966.

Humphrey graduated from East Central University. He worked for the Oklahoma Department of Corrections for twenty years before retiring. He has served as vice president of his local chapter of the Fraternal Order of Police. Humphrey and his wife, Carla, have three children.

Oklahoma House of Representatives
Humphrey first ran for the State House in 2016 as the Republican nominee. District 19 includes Choctaw, Pushmataha, Atoka, and Bryan counties. He won re-election in 2018 and 2020. He's served in the 56th Oklahoma Legislature, 57th Oklahoma Legislature, and the 58th Oklahoma Legislature.

56th Legislature
On February 6, 2017, Humphrey introduced  in the state House an anti-abortion bill (House Bill 1441) to require women to obtain the "written informed consent of the father" before obtaining an abortion, except in cases of rape, incest and the mother's health. Humphrey's bill would also compel women "to tell her doctor the father's name and prevents the abortion if the father challenges paternity." The legislation was supported by anti-abortion activists and condemned by abortion-rights groups such as the Center for Reproductive Rights and Planned Parenthood, which called it "extreme" and "irresponsible" as well as unconstitutional.

On February 14, 2017, Humphrey's H.B. 1441 passed the state House Public Health Committee on a 5–2 party-line vote, with Republicans voting yes and Democrats voting no. The committee passed a second anti-abortion bill the same day. H.B. 1441 was never brought up for a vote in the House.

58th Legislature
Humphrey played a major role in SB2, a bill that would ban transgender athletes from participating in women's sports.

In 2021, Humphrey, in an effort to bolster tourism, proposed an official Bigfoot hunting season in Oklahoma, indicating that the Oklahoma Department of Wildlife Conservation would regulate permits and the state would offer a $3 million bounty if such a creature was captured alive and unharmed.

59th Legislature
In 2023, Humphrey introduced HB 2530 to allow county-specific elections to reduce from felonies to misdemeanors the criminal penalties related to cockfighting. He argued the bill as a criminal justice reform measure. The bill advanced out of the House Criminal Judiciary Committee on Feb. 22.

Controversies

Misogyny
In an interview with The Intercept in February 2017, Humphrey referred to pregnant women as "hosts" for the fetus, prompting outrage and criticism from many quarters. Fellow State Representative Emily Virgin called the comment "incredibly disrespectful," while The Oklahoman editorial board wrote that "dehumanizing language is the wrong approach on abortion." Humphrey stood by his use of the term, saying he did not intend to offend anyone.

Transphobia
Humphrey has made multiple transphobic comments. 
In an email responding to a constituent Humphrey said "I understand transgender people have mental illness". This view is not supported by the World Health Organization or the American Psychiatric Association. In an interview published after the incident on April 15, 2021, Humphrey doubled down by saying "I want to tell your audience there is no transgender. There is male and there is female. And transgender would be a mental health issue... So those people that say I'm bigoted, I will say you're insane and you're doing the people wrong by doing that." Freedom Oklahoma, an LGBT advocacy group, denounced Humphrey's comments calling them "a long-debunked  myth".

Electoral history

2016
Humphrey ran unopposed in the Republican primary.

2018
Humphrey ran unopposed in the Republican primary.

2020
Humphrey ran unopposed in the 2020 Oklahoma House of Representatives election.

2022
Humphrey ran unopposed in the 2022 Oklahoma House of Representatives election.

See also
Abortion in Oklahoma

References

External links
Official profile from the Oklahoma House of Representatives

Living people
Republican Party members of the Oklahoma House of Representatives
People from Atoka County, Oklahoma
East Central University alumni
1966 births